Areneidae is a family of sea snails, marine gastropod mollusks in the clade Vetigastropoda.

Areneidae was previously not officially described as a taxon name. Areneidae is provisionally placed within the superfamily Angarioidea according to Williams et al. (2008). In 2012 it was moved to the superfamily Trochoidea

Genera 
There are two genera within the family Areneidae:
 Arene Adams, 1845
 Cinysca Killburn, 1970

References

External links
 McLean J.H. (2012) New species and genera of colloniids from Indo-Pacific coral reefs, with the definition of a new subfamily Liotipomatinae n. subfam. (Turbinoidea, Colloniidae). Zoosystema 34(2): 343-376